Mottier is a French commune located in the Isère department in the Auvergne-Rhône-Alpes region. The village is overlooked by the ruins of an old fortified house dating from the 12th century, and the inhabitants of the area are called the Mottiérots.

Demography

See also
Communes of the Isère department

References

Communes of Isère
Isère communes articles needing translation from French Wikipedia